Sergio Rubén Blanco Soto (born 25 November 1981) is a Uruguayan football manager and former player who played as a striker. He is the current manager of Montevideo Wanderers.

International career
Blanco has been capped 4 times by Uruguay and scored 1 goal.

References

External links

1981 births
Living people
Uruguayan footballers
Footballers from Montevideo
Association football forwards
Uruguayan expatriate footballers
Uruguay international footballers
Uruguayan Primera División players
Liga MX players
Peruvian Primera División players
Montevideo Wanderers F.C. players
Club Nacional de Football players
Club Atlético Patronato footballers
Dorados de Sinaloa footballers
Club América footballers
San Luis F.C. players
Querétaro F.C. footballers
Club Necaxa footballers
Shanghai Shenhua F.C. players
Chinese Super League players
Sporting Cristal footballers
Uruguayan expatriate sportspeople in China
Uruguayan expatriate sportspeople in Peru
Expatriate footballers in Argentina
Expatriate footballers in China
Expatriate footballers in Mexico
Expatriate footballers in Peru
Uruguayan football managers
Uruguayan Primera División managers
Montevideo Wanderers managers